Anthribola decorata is a species of beetle in the family Cerambycidae. It was described by Bates in 1879.

References

Dorcasominae
Beetles described in 1879